Padilla is a genus of jumping spiders that was first described by George and Elizabeth Peckham in 1894. Most males have a characteristic long, forward projecting process on each chelicera that looks like a lance that is bent near the tip. The exception is P. javana, that doesn't have this feature.

Proszynski drew the genitalia of both genders in 1987, and they resemble those of Marengo.

Species
 it contains nineteen species, most endemic to Madagascar, and one species only occurring on Java:
Padilla ambigua Ledoux, 2007 – Réunion
Padilla armata Peckham & Peckham, 1894 (type) – Madagascar
Padilla astina Andriamalala, 2007 – Madagascar
Padilla boritandroka Andriamalala, 2007 – Madagascar
Padilla cornuta (Peckham & Peckham, 1885) – Madagascar
Padilla foty Andriamalala, 2007 – Madagascar
Padilla graminicola Ledoux, 2007 – Réunion
Padilla griswoldi Andriamalala, 2007 – Madagascar
Padilla javana Simon, 1900 – Indonesia (Java)
Padilla lavatandroka Andriamalala, 2007 – Madagascar
Padilla maingoka Andriamalala, 2007 – Madagascar
Padilla manjelatra Andriamalala, 2007 – Madagascar
Padilla mazavaloha Andriamalala, 2007 – Madagascar
Padilla mihaingo Andriamalala, 2007 – Madagascar
Padilla mitohy Andriamalala, 2007 – Madagascar
Padilla ngeroka Andriamalala, 2007 – Madagascar
Padilla ombimanga Andriamalala, 2007 – Madagascar
Padilla rhizophorae Dierkens, 2014 – Comoros, Mayotte
Padilla sartor Simon, 1900 – Madagascar

References

Salticidae genera
Salticidae
Spiders of Africa
Spiders of Asia